Sierah Joughin (February 11, 1996 – July 22, 2016) was an American woman who was abducted and murdered in Delta, Ohio. She disappeared on July 19, 2016, and was found dead three days later. Her assailant, James D. Worley, was convicted and sentenced to death for the murder and over twenty years in prison for the kidnapping, assault, and other related charges. His execution is currently scheduled for May 20, 2025.

Worley had been previously convicted and imprisoned for the assault and attempted kidnapping of another woman under markedly similar circumstances but was released after three years and was not listed in any state or federal offender database at the time of Joughin's murder. Consequently, the killing prompted the creation of Ohio Senate Bill 231 ("Sierah's Law"), a statute that provides for a searchable database of felons living in the state, who are convicted of specific violent offenses. The statute was signed into law in December 2018.

Sierah Joughin 
Sierah Catherine Joughin was born in Sylvania, Ohio on February 11, 1996, to parents Sheila Vaculik and Tom Joughin. Nicknamed "Ce" by friends and family, she graduated from Evergreen High School in 2014. At the time of her death, she was enrolled at University of Toledo's Junior College of Business, studying human resource management and interning at her uncle's metal stamping business.

James Worley 

James Dean Worley (born April 8, 1959) was born in Tacoma, Washington and graduated from Evergreen High School in Metamora, Ohio in 1978. He worked various jobs in Toledo, Ohio, as a farmer in Delta, and as a grounds crew member for several county fairs. Regarding his education, Worley attributed his 1.59 grade-point average to being a frequent user and seller of marijuana from the age of 14.

In July 1990, Worley ambushed a young woman, Robin Gardner, while she was riding her bike in Whitehouse, Ohio. He struck her with his truck, got out of the vehicle, struck her on the head, and placed her in handcuffs. He then held a screwdriver to her throat and stated, "I'll kill you if you don't stop screaming," and attempted to force her into the vehicle. Gardner was able to escape and was picked up by a passing motorist. Worley was ultimately arrested and convicted on abduction charges and sentenced to 4 – 10 years in prison, with the possibility of parole. He served three years in prison for the crime before he was released early by his own petition.

Worley returned to prison in 2000 when he was convicted of cultivating marijuana plants and possessing weapons while on disability, both felonies at that time. He was released two years later, in 2002, again after petitioning for early release. After his second release from prison, he started a small business at his residence and was licensed as a trailer transporter.

Murder, investigation and arrest 

At approximately 6:45 PM on July 19, 2016, Joughin was riding her bicycle home from her boyfriend's house while he rode alongside her on his motorcycle. They parted ways near County Road 6 near Metamora, Ohio in Fulton County, as he turned around to return home, while she continued. When she did not arrive home that evening, and her boyfriend told her family that he couldn't reach her by cell phone, they contacted authorities. Later that evening, Joughin's bicycle was discovered several rows into a cornfield near where she was last seen, and the county sheriff noted signs of a struggle, along with motorcycle tracks through the corn. With the assistance of the FBI, authorities made efforts to track Joughin using her Fitbit activity tracker and smartphone, the latter of which returned a signal several miles from where her bicycle was located, but this did not produce any new leads. Rewards ranging from $25,000 to $100,000 were offered for any information leading to her safe recovery.

Several items that did not belong to Joughin were discovered near her bicycle, including a pair of men's sunglasses (which tested positive for male DNA), a screwdriver, and a box of automotive fuses. A passing driver also recovered a motorcycle helmet with a bloody hand print on its surface. Joughin's boyfriend was not considered a person of interest as his helmet could quickly be accounted for. When officers were canvassing the neighborhood after Joughin's disappearance, Worley, who lived under 2 miles away, told them his motorcycle had broken down in the area and that he had lost items of the same description as those at the crime scene. He also stated that he had discovered two bicycles in the corn, one of which he took and that it would have his fingerprints on it. He commented that he "didn't steal anything or kill anyone." Another witness in the area described seeing a passenger van driving at a high speed through the area, and provided a license plate number to the authorities. The license plate was soon discovered to be registered to Worley, who had been convicted and sentenced in 1990 for assaulting and attempting to kidnap another woman, who he knocked off her bicycle. Based on this information, investigators obtained a search warrant for Worley's property.

Upon searching a barn on Worley's property, authorities discovered a hidden room, where they found several pairs of women's underwear (on one of which blood was found), restraints, and a carpet-lined freezer stained with blood. They also found blood on Worley's motorcycle, as well as "zip-tie" restraints and a ski mask in his truck. Joughin's DNA was found on a piece of duct tape and on an inflatable mattress both found in the barn. Investigators found recording devices all over the property and concluded from cell phone records that Worley was at the scene of the abduction for nearly two hours during the time Joughin was missing. They also discovered that Worley had told a court-mandated therapist, after his previous conviction that he "learned from each abduction he had done and the next one he was going to bury." He was arrested on charges of abduction on July 22, three days after Joughin's disappearance. A spokesperson for the sheriff's office suggested that Worley fit the profile of a serial offender and that he could potentially have additional unknown victims, possibly kept at the property. Despite an exhaustive search, neither Joughin nor any human remains were found there.

On the same day, Worley was arrested, at around 6:00 PM, Joughin's remains were discovered in a shallow grave in a field along County Road 7 in Delta, Ohio, a few miles southwest of Worley's property. Her body was found intact, hogtied (wrists handcuffed and bound to the ankles behind the back), a large plastic toy in her mouth functioning as a gag, and wearing an adult diaper. An autopsy determined the cause of death as asphyxiation, caused by the gag. There was no evidence of sexual assault. The precise time of death was not determined, but the official time of death was 9:00 PM on July 22, 2016, when she was declared dead by medical professionals.

Legal proceedings

Indictment and arraignment 
On August 16, 2016, Worley was indicted on nineteen counts and was jailed without bail. The charges included aggravated murder, kidnapping, felonious assault, abduction, tampering with evidence, and abuse of a corpse. At his arraignment he entered a plea of not guilty on all charges. Prosecutors sought capital punishment for the aggravated murder charge. After two delays in September 2017 and January 2018, and hundreds of potential jurors called, trial testimony began in March 2018 at the Fulton County Common Pleas Court in Wauseon, Ohio, with Judge Jeffrey Robinson presiding over the case.

Allegations and defense summary 
The prosecution alleged that Worley had watched pornography up until the crime was committed, as evidenced by his web browsing history. He ambushed Joughin after encountering her on County Road 6, struck her in the head with his motorcycle helmet (possibly knocking her unconscious and leaving DNA evidence on the helmet), and waited in the cornfield until it was dark. During this time, he called his brother to tell him his motorcycle had broken down, but prosecutors alleged he was next to Joughin in the cornfield when he placed the call. He then rode his motorcycle back home (less than five miles away), drove his van back to the crime scene (during which a witness noticed speeding), and transported her back to the barn at his residence. There he left some of her blood-stained clothes and physically assaulted, hog-tied, and gagged her with a plastic toy. At some point, she asphyxiated from the gag, which prosecutors alleged Worley intended, as it was inserted with enough force to break a tooth. Worley then transported her body to the cornfield close to his property, which he buried approximately two feet deep.

Worley denied having ever encountered or assaulted Joughin. His defense argued that the evidence obtained from the barn, including the underwear, handcuffs, and BDSM-related items, were part of a pornography studio that Worley had intended to start. Worley claimed that he had left behind the helmet and other evidence found near Joughin's bicycle before the disappearance took place when his motorcycle had broken down on the side of the road. They alleged that because of the low concentration of Worley's DNA on the helmet, it may have been someone else who used it to assault Joughin. A witness saw a man crouched in a field wearing red shorts, but no red shorts were recovered at Worley's property, and his defense argued it, therefore, could not have been Worley in the cornfield.

Witnesses 

During the trial, the prosecution presented several witnesses, among them:

 Megan Roberts, BCI Special Agent - testified about physical evidence recovered at the alleged kidnapping site, Worley's residence, and the location where Joughin's body was found, much of which contained both Worley's and Joughin's DNA
 David Morford, Toledo Police Detective - testified about digital evidence, such as cell phone records showing Worley in the vicinity of the crime scene for over two hours, and evidence on his home computer, including pornography searches for terms such as "hogtyed teen", "rape", "stranded" and "helpless"
 Robin Gardner, previous victim of Worley - testified that in July 1990, Worley ran her down with his truck, held a screwdriver to her neck, and threatened to kill her if she didn't come with him; a crime for which he was sentenced to 4–10 years in prison, but only served three before being released.

Worley's defense team presented several witnesses; two of them were longtime friends of his. The first acknowledged under cross-examination that the helmet found on County Road 6 on the night of Joughin's abduction was the same one he had bought for Worley several years prior. The second witness testified under cross-examination that he and Worley smoked marijuana and watched pornography together. At one time, Worley mentioned he wished to start a pornography studio in his barn, where at the time, he was drying marijuana plants. He also stated that Worley was having electrical problems with his motorcycle, but "it never left him stranded".

Verdict and sentencing 
Closing arguments for the trial concluded on March 26, 2018 and jury deliberations began the same day. Worley was found guilty on March 28, 2018 of seventeen of the original nineteen charges, including aggravated murder, after jurors deliberated for a total of less than six hours.

Jury sentencing guidelines in Ohio required the jury to decide if any outweighing mitigating factors in Worley's case warranted a life sentence or if any outweighing aggravating factors warranted a death sentence. Worley's defense argued for a life sentence, describing him as a "damaged man". Criminal psychologist Dr. John Fabian, a witness for the defense, suggested the attack was motivated by "sexual sadism connected with a fetish disorder". He stated Worley had multiple mental health issues, and had diagnosed him with Sexual Paraphilia Disorder. Worley's defense, during their closing statement, suggested that Worley may have had an unnamed accomplice and had an incestuous relationship with his mother before her death. The prosecution dismissed both claims, stating the gravesite was dug hastily, requiring only one person, and that there was little evidence to support an inappropriate relationship between Worley and his mother.

The prosecution argued that because Worley had an average upbringing and knew the difference between right and wrong, the aggravating factors of his crimes outweighed any disorders he may have. During the second day of testimony in the trial's penalty phase, prosecutors presented audio recordings between Worley's sister and a private investigator. She mentioned that Worley had been suspected of killing a prostitute in 2000 (but was never charged as no remains could be found), as well as another woman in the 1970s that Worley described as "the love of his life," but who was not identified and might have still been alive at the time of the interview.

Prior to sentencing, Worley made a 45-minute statement described by The Blade as "rambling and disjointed", in which he stated he believed someone else kidnapped and murdered Joughin, leaving evidence to frame him. Members of the gallery became upset during the statement and left the courtroom after he described Joughin as a "beautiful girl".

The jury recommended capital punishment, which Judge Robinson upheld on April 16, 2018, stating, "If I thought there was a snowball's chance in hell that you were innocent, you'd be looking at [a] life [sentence]". Additionally, Worley was sentenced to 11 years imprisonment for kidnapping, eight years for felonious assault, 11 months for possessing criminal tools, and 36 months each for tampering with evidence and having weapons under disability.

Since April 19, 2018, Worley has been held on death row at the Chillicothe Correctional Institution as inmate #A743593. His execution date, originally set for June 3, 2019, was delayed in June 2018, and again in August 2018 due to appeals. In July 2020, Worley's attorneys filed a motion with the Ohio Supreme Court to overturn his original conviction and grant him a new trial, citing the government's alleged failure to prove several aspects of the charges, Worley's mental illnesses, incompetent counsel, and several alleged violations of jury and evidentiary rules. They argued that the jury in the 2016 trial was "tainted" due to the close-knit nature of the community  that potential jurors were familiar with Worley, the Joughin family, or the case itself  which made a fair trial impossible. The appeal was denied by the court, and an execution date of May 20, 2025 was set for Worley.

Aftermath 
The funeral for Joughin was held on July 28, 2016 at Christ the Word church in Sylvania, Ohio, and her remains were interred in Amboy Township Cemetery, near Metamora, Ohio.

Community events 
Following the arrest of Worley, community residents organized a "Take Back the Roads" memorial walk in honor of Joughin, taking place along the road her bicycle was found.

On October 2, 2016, Evergreen School District hosted a "Joggin' 4 Joughin" 5K run to raise money for the Sierah Joughin Memorial Scholarship Fund and to ask for support for a violent offender registry bill being constructed by Ohio legislators. Event officials expected to attract around 300 participants but were forced to limit the number to 1600 when a large crowd of supporters and participants arrived.

Sierah Joughin Memorial Scholarship Fund 
During the disappearance and search, Joughin's family created a GoFundMe page to request funds to aid in the search effort. After her body was discovered, the family established the Sierah Joughin Memorial Scholarship Fund from the donations, in addition to the funds raised by the school district's 5K run event, to be administered by the Toledo Community Foundation. The scholarship benefits graduates from Evergreen High School (where Joughin graduated) who have participated in a varsity sport and organization. In September 2019, the high school dedicated a plaque and planted two trees on the property honoring Joughin.

Worley property 
In July 2018, Worley's Delta, Ohio property was awarded to Joughin's estate, and her family had the main barn demolished. A monetary settlement of $3.6 million was also reached, but Joughin's family agreed not to execute on the judgement unless "the defendant(s) receives a windfall sum of money such as winning the lottery, or receiving book or movie rights or royalties..."

In August 2020, the Fulton County Sherrif's Department searched the Worley property again, using excavation equipment, with assistance from the FBI. A statement by the sheriff read that the investigation into Worley was ongoing, that any evidence found would be collected with assistance from the FBI Evidence Response Team, and gave no further comment. Joughin's family stated that the search was not related to her case.

Sierah's Law 
After the murder and trial, Joughin's family and other activists argued that not enough information was available to law enforcement and residents regarding convicted felons residing in their communities. If a system had been in place to warn the public of offenders in their area, her murder might have been prevented. Law enforcement had stated to the family during the investigation that Worley was not on any local, state or federal database that tracks offenders, and the family argued that such a database being available might have resulted in Joughin being rescued alive. In July 2016, the organization 'Standing Courageous' started a Change.org petition, calling for lawmakers to establish a "violent offender registry" in Ohio, gathering over 13,000 signatures. Talks among legislators began regarding the creation of a database of violent offenders convicted of specific crimes such as murder, kidnapping and abduction.

Initially introduced as Senate Bill 67, "Sierah's Law" was constructed in February 2017 by Senators Randy Gardner and Cliff Hite and presented to the Ohio Senate Judiciary Committee. Originally, the bill was intended to allow the public to search on a website for offenders with the qualifying convictions, similar to a sex offender registry. After several hearings, where some opponents such as the ACLU argued that the bill did nothing to protect the public and created privacy concerns, the bill was changed so that residents must visit their local sheriff's office to request a search be performed.

In November 2017, "Sierah's Law" was introduced to the Ohio Senate as Senate Bill 231. Joughin's mother spoke before legislators in November 2018, urging them to pass the bill. It was passed on December 6, 2018, and signed into law by Governor John Kasich on December 19. It went into effect on March 20, 2019.

Charitable organizations 
A non-profit charitable organization, Justice For Sierah, was established after the trial by Joughin's mother and aunt, which provides self-defense training courses for schools and communities, and educates the public on community safety topics and Sierah's Law. The organization holds an annual "Spirit of Sierah" 5K race in Sylvania, Ohio.

In media 
In May 2022, local CBS affiliate station WTOL published a report and excerpts of an exclusive interview between Worley and anchor Melissa Andrews. Worley had written Andrews several letters earlier that year and sent a 105-page manifesto claiming his innocence in Joughin's murder. The manifesto itself was not published. In the manifesto, Worley indirectly references a 1996 case of a missing woman named Claudia "Sissy" Tinsley. Andrews concluded that Worley was the last person that Tinsley saw alive and implicated him in her disappearance, but Worley denied any involvement.

The Joughin murder investigation and trial have appeared in several television series and podcasts:

 Buried In the Backyard (Season 2, Episode 10; "Deep In The Cornfields") on Oxygen
 The Long Way Home (Season 1, Episode 1; "Living a Nightmare") on Investigation Discovery
 “Murdered: Sierah Joughin” Crime Junkie podcast, April 19, 2021
 ”Sierah Joughin” Generation Why podcast, September 15, 2019

See also
 List of death row inmates in the United States
 List of people scheduled to be executed in the United States
 List of solved missing person cases

References

External links 
Ohio Senate Bill 231 Text (Ohio Legislature, 133rd General Assembly)
Justice For Sierah Website (Non-Profit Organization)

2010s missing person cases
2016 in Ohio
2016 murders in the United States
Deaths by person in Ohio
Deaths from asphyxiation
Female murder victims
Formerly missing people
History of women in Ohio
July 2016 crimes in the United States
Missing person cases in Ohio
People murdered in Ohio